Ian Miles Crawford (born September 29, 1988) is an American musician and vocalist born in Eugene, Oregon. He is most prominently known for being a guitarist and backing vocalist for a number of different bands including The Cab, Panic! at the Disco, Never Shout Never, and The Academy Is... In 2016, he founded the rock and roll group The Contestants, which released their debut studio album, No Contest, in May 2016.

On April 1, 2018, Ian released his solo album, Grand Wheel.

Career
He was lead guitarist of The Cab from 2007 until his departure in 2009. On June 1, 2009 The Cab's lead singer Alexander DeLeon announced on his blog that guitarist Ian Crawford had decided to leave the band. Although DeLeon did say that Crawford had decided to leave due to creative differences, there seemed to be no animosity between him and the band. For their upcoming "What Happens in Vegas..." tour, The Cab announced that their friend Bryan Dawson would be replacing Crawford.

Crawford was also a touring guitarist for Panic! at the Disco. In 2009, after the departure of Ryan Ross and Jon Walker, Crawford joined Panic! at the Disco as their touring guitarist. He left the band in 2012, explaining that he wished to make "real, genuine" music.

On June 11, 2014, it was announced that Crawford would become the lead guitarist of Never Shout Never. On November 24, 2015, it was confirmed by Crawford himself that he was kicked out of the band. Crawford also announced that he would go on tour with The Academy Is... on their 10th anniversary tour.

In 2016, Ian Crawford formed the rock and roll band The Contestants and released their debut studio album, No Contest, on May 6, 2016.

Ian is also a member of the Seattle band The Hollers.

In 2018, Ian released his solo album Grand Wheel.

Discography

Solo

 Grand Wheel  (2018)
"Losing My Religion" 
"Over My Head, Over Me 
"Better in Time" music by Ian Crawford lyrics by Ren Patrick

With The Cab
Whisper War (2008)
Welcome to the New Administration (2008)
"Bounce (snippet)" & "Take My Hand Machine Shop Production" 
Punk Goes Pop 2 (2008)
"Disturbia" (Rihanna Cover)
The Lady Luck EP (2009)
"Take My Hand (Remix)(feat. Cassadee Pope)", "Diamonds Are Forever (And Forever Is A Long Time)" & "Lights"
Symphony Soldier (2011)

With Stamps 
Tramps (2010)
Stamps Ventures of a Lifetime (2011)

With Play For Keeps
2010 Goodbye Natural, Hello Manmade. – guitar on "X.I.F."

With Dallon Weekes
guitar on "Skid Row (Downtown)"

With Ashbury
2008 guitar and vocals on "Under Your Skin"

With Never Shout Never
2015 Recycled Youth, Vol. 1
2015 Black Cat

References

1989 births
American rock guitarists
American male guitarists
Fueled by Ramen artists
Lead guitarists
Living people
Musicians from Eugene, Oregon
Guitarists from Oregon
21st-century American guitarists
21st-century American male musicians